Claude Orval (1897–1963) was a French screenwriter and film director.

Selected filmography
 Duel in Dakar (1951)

References

Bibliography
 Philippe Rège. Encyclopedia of French Film Directors, Volume 1. Scarecrow Press, 2009.

External links

1897 births
1963 deaths
20th-century French screenwriters
Film directors from Paris